ASIAN KUNG-FU GENERATION presents Nano–Mugen Compilation 2008 is a compilation album released by Asian Kung-Fu Generation on July 9, 2008, to advertise their seventh annual Nano-Mugen Festival held at the Yokohama Arena through July 20–21st. The album features one song from each of the sixteen groups, from Japan, United States, and United Kingdom, who performed at the festival.

Track listing
 – ASIAN KUNG-FU GENERATION
"Sayonara 90's" – Analog Fish
 – Art-School
"You Can't Have It All" – Ash
"Mr. Feather" – ELLEGARDEN
"All Time Lows" – Hellogoodbye
"Do the Panic" – Phantom Planet
"Across the Sky" – Space Cowboy
"Laurentech" – SPECIAL OTHERS
"My Friends" – Stereophonics
"Alibi" – STRAIGHTENER
"Semi-Charmed Life" – Third Eye Blind
"Parachute" – Shugo Tokumaru
"MASHitUP" – The Young Punx
"RIWO" – 8otto
"Punishment" – 9mm Parabellum Bullet

Chart positions

Album

Songs

References

External links
 Nano-Mugen official website 
 Nano-Mugen official website 

Asian Kung-Fu Generation albums
2008 compilation albums